Miles Ukaoma  (born 21 July 1992) is an American-born Nigerian hurdler. In 2016, Miles Ukaoma qualified for the 2016 Rio Olympics Men's 400 metres hurdles|400 metres hurdles event, He competed in the 400 metres hurdles event at the 2015 World Championships in Beijing narrowly missing the semifinals. His personal best in the 400 metres hurdles is 48.84 seconds set in Warri in 2015.

Competition record

1Disqualified in the final

References

External links

 

1992 births
Living people
Nigerian male hurdlers
World Athletics Championships athletes for Nigeria
Place of birth missing (living people)
Athletes (track and field) at the 2014 Commonwealth Games
Athletes (track and field) at the 2016 Summer Olympics
Olympic athletes of Nigeria
People from Sedgwick County, Kansas
Track and field athletes from Kansas
American sportspeople of Nigerian descent
Commonwealth Games competitors for Nigeria
Nebraska Cornhuskers men's track and field athletes